In digital electronics, a level shifter, also called  logic-level shifter or voltage level translator, is a circuit used to translate signals from one logic level or voltage domain to another, allowing compatibility between integrated circuits with different voltage requirements, such as TTL and CMOS.  Modern systems use level shifters to bridge domains between processors, logic, sensors, and other circuits.  In recent years, the three most common logic levels have been 1.8V, 3.3V, and 5V, though levels above and below these voltages are also used.

Types of level shifter
Uni-directional – All input pins are dedicated to one voltage domain, all output pins are dedicated to the other.
 
Bi-directional with Dedicated ports – Each voltage domain has both input and output pins, but the data direction of a pin does not change.
 
Bi-directional with external direction indicator – When an external signal is changed, inputs become outputs and vice versa.
 
Bi-directional, auto-sensing – A pair of I/O spanning voltage domains can act as either inputs or outputs depending on external stimulus without the need for a dedicated direction control pin.

Hardware implementation
Fixed function level shifter ICs - These ICs provide several different types of level shift in fixed function devices. Often lumped into 2-bit, 4-bit, or 8-bit level shift configurations offered with various VDD1 and VDD2 ranges, these devices translate logic levels without any additional integrated logic or timing adjustment.
 
Configurable mixed-signal ICs (CMICs) – Level shifter circuitry can also be implemented in a CMIC. The no-code programmable nature of CMICs allows designers to implement fully customizable level shifters with the added option to integrate configurable logic or timing adjustments in the same device.

Applications of level shifters
Since level shifters are used to resolve the voltage incompatibility between various parts of a system, they have a wide range of applications as well. Level shifters are widely used in interfacing legacy devices and also in SD cards, SIM cards, CF cards, audio codecs and UARTs.

See also
 Line level

References

External links
 Voltage Level Translation Guide, Texas Instruments.
IC examples from three different logic families
 74AXC1T45, 1-bit bidirectional with direction control, dual-supply of 0.65V-3.6V translated to 0.65V-3.6V, available only in SMD packages. 4-bit 74AXC4T245 and 8-bit 74AXC8T245 exist too.
 74LVC1T45, 1-bit bidirectional with direction control, dual-supply of 1.65V-5.5V translated to 1.65V-5.5V, available only in SMD packages. 2-bit 74LVC2T45 and 8-bit 74LVC8T245 exist too.
 4504B, 6-bit unidirectional, dual-supply of 5V TTL or 5V-18V CMOS translated to 5V-18V CMOS, available in DIP or SMD packages.

Digital electronics